Frederick Henry "Harry" Wyld (born 5 June 1900, Mansfield, England, died Derby, England, 5 April 1976) was a British track cyclist. He won bronze medals at the 1924 and the 1928 Summer Olympics.

On 5 August 1928 in Amsterdam, Harry Wyld, with Frank Southall, Percy Wyld and his brother Leonard Wyld, broke the Olympic team pursuit record by 9.2 seconds, in 5:01.6. They were the third team to hold the record since it began on 10 August 1920. It was broken by 10.2 seconds next day before standing for nearly eight years. It is likely the record was broken in the quarter or semi-final as they won a bronze medal; they would have proceeded to the final had the record been broken in qualifying rounds.

References

1900 births
1976 deaths
English male cyclists
Olympic cyclists of Great Britain
Cyclists at the 1924 Summer Olympics
Cyclists at the 1928 Summer Olympics
Olympic bronze medallists for Great Britain
Olympic medalists in cycling
Sportspeople from Mansfield
Medalists at the 1924 Summer Olympics
Medalists at the 1928 Summer Olympics